Daring Deeds is a 1927 American silent comedy film directed by Duke Worne and starring Billy Sullivan, Molly Malone and Earl Metcalfe.

Synopsis
After arguing with his father, an airplane manufacturer, William Gordon Jr. flies off in his plane in search of adventure. He manages to fall in love and win a transcontinental air race.

Cast
 Billy Sullivan as William Gordon Jr
 Molly Malone as Helen Courtney
 Earl Metcalfe as Rance Sheldon
 Thomas G. Lingham as William Gordon Sr
 Robert Walker as Walter Sarles
 Lafe McKee as John Courtney
 Milburn Morante as 'Smudge' Rafferty
 Robert Littlefield as Mysterious Stranger

References

Bibliography
 Munden, Kenneth White. The American Film Institute Catalog of Motion Pictures Produced in the United States, Part 1. University of California Press, 1997.

External links
 

1927 films
1927 comedy films
1920s English-language films
American silent feature films
Silent American comedy films
Films directed by Duke Worne
Rayart Pictures films
1920s American films